Sergio Álvarez Conde (born 3 August 1986), known simply as Sergio, is a Spanish former footballer who played as a goalkeeper.

He spent his entire professional career with Celta, making 197 competitive appearances.

Club career

Born in Catoira, Province of Pontevedra, Sergio began his career with local Arosa SC, joining Galician neighbours RC Celta de Vigo in 1999 at the age of 13. He made his senior debut with their reserves in Segunda División B, playing four full seasons in that tier and spending 2008–09 on loan to another club in that league and region, Racing de Ferrol.

Sergio made his debut for Celta's first team on 4 June 2011, in a 3–0 Segunda División home win against FC Cartagena, the last matchday of the campaign. Shortly after, following the starter Ismael Falcón's departure to Hércules CF, he was definitely promoted to the main squad, being awarded the #1 jersey.

Sergio played his first match in La Liga on 5 October 2012, keeping a clean sheet in a 2–0 home victory over Sevilla FC. He would spend the season as a backup to Javi Varas, however.

Varas subsequently returned to Sevilla from his loan but Sergio remained as understudy, behind fellow youth graduate Yoel. After the latter's departure to Valencia CF, he renewed his link until 2016 and was finally chosen as first choice.

On 1 November 2014, Sergio made a string of superb saves to deny FC Barcelona in a 1–0 win at the Camp Nou. He was also an important unit of the Célticos in a 2–0 home defeat of Atlético Madrid on 15 February of the following year, finishing the season between the posts.

In 2016–17, Sergio took part in his first European campaign, playing ten UEFA Europa League matches as Celta reached the semi-finals and lost 2–1 on aggregate to eventual champions Manchester United. The following campaign, under new manager Juan Carlos Unzué, he battled for the starting position against youngster Rubén Blanco.

Having made only two league appearances, Sergio suffered a meniscus injury to his right knee in May 2020; Celta used the emergency transfer allocation to sign attacker Nolito rather than another goalkeeper. On 20 May 2021, aged 34, he announced his retirement from professional football.

Career statistics

References

External links

1986 births
Living people
People from Caldas (comarca)
Sportspeople from the Province of Pontevedra
Spanish footballers
Footballers from Galicia (Spain)
Association football goalkeepers
La Liga players
Segunda División players
Segunda División B players
Celta de Vigo B players
RC Celta de Vigo players
Racing de Ferrol footballers